Five Bathing at a Lake (German: Fünf badende am See) is a 1911 oil on canvas painting by the Expressionist German painter Ernst Ludwig Kirchner. It depicts five nude women, in different poses, near a lake. The painting is exhibited at Brücke Museum in Berlin.

References

1911 paintings
Bathing in art
Nude art
Paintings by Ernst Ludwig Kirchner
Paintings in Berlin